Chirra Ravikanthreddy (born 11 July 1981) is an Indian cricket umpire. He has stood in matches in the Ranji Trophy tournament, the Indian Premier League https://www.iplt20.com/ and https://www.wplt20.com/.

References

External links
 

1981 births
Living people
Indian cricket umpires
Cricketers from Visakhapatnam